The following highways are numbered 34B:

United States
 Nebraska Spur 34B
 New York State Route 34B
 Oklahoma State Highway 34B

See also
List of highways numbered 34